The Ngarinyin or Ngarinjin are an Aboriginal Australian people of the Kimberley region of Western Australia. Their language, Ngarinyin, is also known as Ungarinyin. When referring to their traditional lands, they refer to themselves as Wilinggin people.

Language

Ngarinyin, or Ungarinyin, is one of three languages belonging to the Worrorran language family. As of 2003 there were 82 speakers of Ngarinyin spread out from Derby to the King River. At the time of the 2016 Australian census, there were 38 people recorded to speak the language at home.

According to Rumsey, Ngarinyin may be applied to either the language or the people who speak it, whereas Ungarinyin may only refer to the language. McGregor reported that "Ngarinyin has been chosen as the preferred language name" by the community.

Social organisation
The Ngarinjin were composed of roughly 40 groups. Each of these local divisions, with its own distinctive clan and moiety classification.

The Wunambal, Worrorra, and Ngarinyin peoples form a cultural bloc known Wanjina Wunggurr. The shared culture is based on the dreamtime mythology and law whose creators are the Wanjina and Wunggurr spirits, ancestors of these peoples. The Wunambal Gaambera Aboriginal Corporation represents the Wunambal Gaambera people; Uunguu refers to their "home", or country.

Country
To the southeast their boundaries ran along the northern face of the Wunaamin Miliwundi Ranges. Their land included the Isdell Valley to Isdell Range, running east as far as the Phillips Range, the headwaters of the Chapman River, Blackfellow Creek, and Wood River. Their confines to the north lay along the Barnett and Harris Ranges, and to where the Gibb River joins with the upper Drysdale across to the Maitland Range. They were present also at the King River headwaters, as far as around about Mount Reid. Their western frontier was set at Mounts Bradshaw and Han. Their territory to the southeast reached Mount French on the highlands.

Before the coming of white settlement, it appears that the Ngarinjin were pressing south into territory held by the Punaba.

Native title

As part of the same native title claim lodged in 1998 by Wanjina Wunggurr RNTBC known as the Dambimangari claim, which included claims for the three peoples in the cultural bloc, referred to as Dambimangari, Uunguu and Wilinggin (see above), the Wilinggin claim was the first to be determined, by litigation on 27 August 2004. The claim covers an area of more than   along the Gibb River Road.

The Kimberley Land Council Aboriginal Corporation represented the people in this claim.

The Wanjina Wunggurr RNTBC acts on behalf of the Ngarinyin/Wilinggin, Worrora/Dambimangari, and Wunambal Gaambera/Uunguu native title holders with regard to their rights and interests.

National park
The new park would be jointly managed by the WA government and Wilinggin traditional owners. The area adjoins the northern portion of the former King Leopold Ranges Conservation Park which is now known as Wunaamin Conservation Park. The new park was planned to form part of the Kimberley National Park, which would be Australia's biggest national park, but this idea had  been shelved after a change of government in 2017.

Ethnography
The German ethnographer Helmut Petri, during the Frobenius expedition of 1938-1939, lived among the Ngarinjin and took copious notes on the lore language and mythology of the Ngarinjin, and gathered many objects of their traditional craftsmanship. A large part of his material, conserved in Frankfurt am Main, was obliterated during one of the many Allied bombing runs on that city, which razed to the ground the Museum der Weltkulturen, where Petri worked.

Alternative names

 Andedja.
 Andidja.
 Angarinjin.
 Arawari (a Worrorran word meaning "southeastwards")
 Arkarinjindja
 Gular (a name applied to some groups, with kular meaning "west")
 Ingarinjindja (a Ngarinyin adult male)
 Marangana (of people who speak as the Ngarinyin do)
 Narrinyind
 Ngaring-ngyan
 Ngarinjin
 Ngerringun Kandjalngari (northern group)
 Njingarinjanja (a Ngarinyin adult female)
 Oladjau(Miriwung term for their language).
 (Ungarinjin, Unrjarinjin, Ungarinyin, Ungarinjen) 
 Walmidi (Forrest River name)
 Wangarinjinu
 Warnarinjin

Footnotes

References

Citations

Sources

Further reading
  Text may be copied from this source, which is available under a Attribution 4.0 International  (CC BY 4.0) licence.

Aboriginal peoples of Western Australia
Kimberley (Western Australia)